This is a list of electoral divisions and wards in the ceremonial county of Essex in the East of England. All changes since the re-organisation of local government following the passing of the Local Government Act 1972 are shown. The number of councillors elected for each electoral division or ward is shown in brackets.

County council

Essex
Electoral Divisions from 1 April 1974 (first election 12 April 1973) to 7 May 1981:

Electoral Divisions from 7 May 1981 to 5 May 2005:

Electoral Divisions from 5 May 2005 to present:

† minor boundary changes in 2009 ‡ minor boundary changes in 2013

Unitary authority councils

Southend-on-Sea
Wards from 1 April 1974 (first election 7 June 1973) to 6 May 1976:

Wards from 6 May 1976 to 7 June 2001:

Wards from 7 June 2001 to present:

Thurrock
Wards from 1 April 1974 (first election 7 June 1973) to 3 May 1979:

Wards from 3 May 1979 to 1 May 1997:

Wards from 1 May 1997 to 10 June 2004:

Wards from 10 June 2004 to present:

District councils

Basildon
Wards from 1 April 1974 (first election 7 June 1973) to 3 May 1979:

Wards from 3 May 1979 to 2 May 2002:

Wards from 2 May 2002 to present:

Braintree
Wards from 1 April 1974 (first election 7 June 1973) to 3 May 1979:

Wards from 3 May 1979 to 1 May 2003:

Wards from 1 May 2003 to 7 May 2015:

Wards from 7 May 2015 to present:

Brentwood
Wards from 1 April 1974 (first election 7 June 1973) to 6 May 1976:

Wards from 6 May 1976 to 2 May 2002:

Wards from 2 May 2002 to present:

Castle Point
Wards from 1 April 1974 (first election 7 June 1973) to 3 May 1979:

Wards from 3 May 1979 to 1 May 2003:

Wards from 1 May 2003 to present:

Chelmsford
Wards from 1 April 1974 (first election 7 June 1973) to 6 May 1976:

Wards from 6 May 1976 to 7 May 1987:

Wards from 7 May 1987 to 1 May 2003:

Wards from 1 May 2003 to present:

Colchester
Wards from 1 April 1974 (first election 7 June 1973) to 6 May 1976:

Wards from 6 May 1976 to 3 May 1990:

Wards from 3 May 1990 to 2 May 2002:

Wards from 2 May 2002 to 5 May 2016:

Wards from 5 May 2016 to present:

Epping Forest
Wards from 1 April 1974 (first election 7 June 1973) to 3 May 1979:

Wards from 3 May 1979 to 2 May 2002:

Wards from 2 May 2002 to present:

† minor boundary changes in 2012

Harlow
Wards from 1 April 1974 (first election 7 June 1973) to 6 May 1976:

Wards from 6 May 1976 to 2 May 2002:

Wards from 2 May 2002 to present:

Maldon
Wards from 1 April 1974 (first election 7 June 1973) to 3 May 1979:

Wards from 3 May 1979 to 1 May 2003:

Wards from 1 May 2003 to present:

Rochford
Wards from 1 April 1974 (first election 7 June 1973) to 6 May 1976:

Wards from 6 May 1976 to 2 May 2002:

Wards from 2 May 2002 to 5 May 2016:

Wards from 5 May 2016 to present:

Tendring
Wards from 1 April 1974 (first election 7 June 1973) to 6 May 1976:

Wards from 6 May 1976 to 1 May 2003:

Wards from 1 May 2003 to 2 May 2019:

Wards from 2 May 2019 to present:

Uttlesford
Wards from 1 April 1974 (first election 7 June 1973) to 6 May 1976:

Wards from 6 May 1976 to 1 May 2003:

Wards from 1 May 2003 to 7 May 2015:

† minor boundary changes in 2011

Wards from 7 May 2015 to present:

Electoral wards by constituency

Basildon and Billericay
Billericay East, Billericay West, Burstead, Crouch, Fryerns, Laindon Park, Lee Chapel North, St Martin's.

Braintree
Bocking Blackwater, Bocking North, Bocking South, Braintree Central, Braintree East, Braintree South, Bumpstead, Cressing and Stisted, Gosfield and Greenstead Green, Great Notley and Braintree West, Halstead St Andrews, Halstead Trinity, Hedingham and Maplestead, Panfield, Rayne, Stour Valley North, Stour Valley South, The Three Colnes, Three Fields, Upper Colne, Yeldham.

Brentwood and Ongar
Brentwood North, Brentwood South, Brentwood West, Brizes and Doddinghurst, Chipping Ongar, Greensted and Marden Ash, Herongate, Ingrave and West Horndon, High Ongar, Willingale and The Rodings, Hutton Central, Hutton East, Hutton North, Hutton South, Ingatestone, Fryerning and Mountnessing, Lambourne, Moreton and Fyfield, North Weald Bassett, Passingford, Pilgrims Hatch, Shelley, Shenfield, South Weald, Tipps Cross, Warley.

Castle Point
Appleton, Boyce, Canvey Island Central, Canvey Island East, Canvey Island North, Canvey Island South, Canvey Island West, Canvey Island Winter Gardens, Cedar Hall, St George's, St James, St Mary's, St Peter's, Victoria.

Chelmsford
Chelmer Village and Beaulieu Park, Galleywood, Goat Hall, Great Baddow East, Great Baddow West, Marconi, Moulsham and Central, Moulsham Lodge, Patching Hall, St Andrews, Springfield North, The Lawns, Trinity, Waterhouse Farm.

Clacton
Alton Park, Beaumont and Thorpe, Bockings Elm, Burrsville, Frinton, Golf Green, Hamford, Haven, Holland and Kirby, Homelands, Little Clacton and Weeley, Peter Bruff, Pier, Rush Green, St Bartholomews, St James, St Johns, St Marys, St Osyth and Point Clear, St Pauls, Walton.

Colchester
Berechurch, Castle, Christ Church, Harbour, Highwoods, Lexden, Mile End, New Town, Prettygate, St Andrew's, St Anne's, St John's, Shrub End.

Epping Forest
Broadley Common, Epping Upland and Nazeing, Buckhurst Hill East, Buckhurst Hill West, Chigwell Row, Chigwell Village, Epping Hemnall, Epping Lindsey and Thornwood Common, Grange Hill, Loughton Alderton, Loughton Broadway, Loughton Fairmead, Loughton Forest, Loughton Roding, Loughton St John's, Loughton St Mary's, Theydon Bois, Waltham Abbey High Beach, Waltham Abbey Honey Lane, Waltham Abbey North East, Waltham Abbey Paternoster, Waltham Abbey South West.

Harlow
Bush Fair, Church Langley, Great Parndon, Harlow Common, Hastingwood, Matching and Sheering Village, Little Parndon and Hare Street, Lower Nazeing, Lower Sheering, Mark Hall, Netteswell, Old Harlow, Roydon, Staple Tye, Sumners and Kingsmoor, Toddbrook.

Harwich and North Essex
Alresford, Ardleigh and Little Bromley, Bradfield, Wrabness and Wix, Brightlingsea, Dedham and Langham, East Donyland, Fordham and Stour, Great and Little Oakley, Great Bentley, Great Tey, Harwich East, Harwick East Central, Harwich West, Harwich West Central, Lawford, Manningtree, Mistley, Little Bentley and Tendring, Pyefleet, Ramsey and Parkeston, Thorrington, Frating, Elmstead and Great Bromley, West Bergholt and Eight Ash Green, West Mersea, Wivenhoe Cross, Wivenhoe Quay.

Maldon
Althorne, Bicknacre and East and West Hanningfield, Burnham-on-Crouch North, Burnham-on-Crouch South, Heybridge East, Heybridge West, Little Baddow, Danbury and Sandon, Maldon East, Maldon North, Maldon South, Maldon West, Mayland, Purleigh, Rettendon and Runwell, South Hanningfield, Stock and Margaretting, South Woodham -Chetwood and Collingwood, South Woodham - Elmwood and Woodville, Southminster, Tillingham.

Rayleigh and Wickford
Ashingdon and Canewdon, Downhall and Rawreth, Grange, Hawkwell North, Hawkwell South, Hawkwell West, Hockley Central, Hockley North, Hockley West, Hullbridge, Lodge, Rayleigh Central, Sweyne Park, Trinity, Wheatley, Whitehouse, Wickford Castledon, Wickford North, Wickford Park.

Rochford and Southend East
Barling and Sutton, Foulness and Great Wakering, Kursaal, Milton, Rochford, St Luke's, Shoeburyness, Southchurch, Thorpe, Victoria, West Shoebury.

Saffron Walden
Ashdon, Barnston and High Easter, Birchanger, Boreham and The Leighs, Broad Oak and the Hallingburys, Broomfield and The Walthams, Chelmsford Rural West, Clavering, Elsenham and Henham, Felsted, Great Dunmow North, Great Dunmow South, Hatfield Heath, Littlebury, Newport, Saffron Walden Audley, Saffron Walden Castle, Saffron Walden Shire, Stansted North, Stansted South, Stebbing, Stort Valley, Takeley and the Canfields, Thaxted, The Chesterfords, The Eastons, The Rodings, The Sampfords, Wenden Lofts, Wimbish and Debden, Writtle.

South Basildon and East Thurrock
Corringham and Fobbing, East Tilbury, Langdon Hills, Nethermayne, Orsett, Pitsea North West, Pitsea South East, Stanford East and Corringham Town, Stanford-le-Hope West, The Homesteads, Vange.

Southend West
Belfairs, Blenheim Park, Chalkwell, Eastwood Park, Leigh, Prittlewell, St Laurence, Westborough, West Leigh.

Thurrock
Aveley and Uplands, Belhus, Chadwell St Mary, Chafford and North Stifford, Grays Riverside, Grays Thurrock, Little Thurrock Blackshots, Little Thurrock Rectory, Ockendon, South Chafford, Stifford Clays, Tilbury Riverside and Thurrock Park, Tilbury St Chads, West Thurrock and South Stifford.

Witham
Black Notley and Terling, Birch and Winstree, Bradwell, Silver End and Rivenhall, Coggeshall and North Feering, Copford and West Stanway, Great Totham, Hatfield Peverel, Kelvedon, Marks Tey, Stanway, Tiptree, Tollesbury, Tolleshunt D’Arcy, Wickham Bishops and Woodham, Witham Chipping Hill and Central, Witham North, Witham South, Witham West.

See also
List of parliamentary constituencies in Essex

References

 
Essex